Gladys Thomas (1934-2022) is a South African poet and playwright. Thomas was one of the first black South African women poets to be published. Her co-authored debut anthology, Cry Rage, was the first book of poetry to be banned in South Africa.

On April 24, 2007, Thomas was awarded the Order of Ikhamanga (Silver) for "Outstanding contribution to poetry and short stories through which she exposed the political injustices and human suffering of the apartheid regime and for raising international consciousness about the ravages of apartheid."

Works
 Cry Rage!, 1972
 Exile Within, 1986
 Spotty Dog and Other Stories: Stories for and of South African Township Children, c.1983
 Avalon Court (Vignettes of Life of the Coloured People on the Cape Flats of Cape Town)

References

1934 births
Living people
South African poets
South African dramatists and playwrights
South African children's writers
South African women children's writers
20th-century South African women writers
21st-century South African women writers
South African women poets